Breda Oost is a proposed railway station in Breda, Netherlands.

History

The station is set to open sometime after 2020. The station lies on the Staatslijn E (Breda - Maastricht) and is located between Breda and Gilze-Rijen. The station is primarily for eastern Breda and small settlements in the area. It is still unknown when construction work will begin. The station plan has been accepted.

Train services
The following train service may call at the station:

Bus service
No information is known at present of any bus services

References

Oost
Proposed railway stations in the Netherlands